The Capitalist Party of South Africa (ZACP) is a South African political party. The party was launched on 17 March 2019 at the Rand Club in Johannesburg, South Africa. The party was founded by Kanthan Pillay, Roman Cabanac, Neo Kuaho, Gideon Joubert, Unathi Kwaza, Duncan McLeod, Sindile Vabaza, Louis Nel, Katlego Mabusela and Dumo Denga.

Core principles
The ten core principles of the party were outlined by Kanthan Pillay at its launch on 17 March 2019.

 Liberty
 Equality
 Tolerance and protection of freedom of expression
 Private property rights protected by law
 Rule of law
 Right to work
 The right to be secure on your own property and to defend yourself against intruders
 Free market and Free international trade relationships
 Firearms for self-defence
 Fraternity

The party's logo is a purple cow designed by local artist, Sarah Britten.

Election results

The party contested the 2019 election at national level only, failing to win any seats.

National elections

|-
! Election
! Total votes
! Share of vote
! Seats 
! +/–
! Government
|-
! 2019
| 15,915
| 0.09%
| 
| –
| 
|}

See also
Political parties in South Africa

References

2019 establishments in South Africa
Classical liberal parties
Liberal parties in South Africa
Libertarian parties
Libertarianism in Africa
Political parties established in 2019
Political parties in South Africa
Political parties based in Johannesburg